Gleb Olegovich Lutfullin (born 31 March 2004) is a Russian figure skater. He is the 2021 JGP Russia champion, the 2021 JGP Poland champion and the 2019 JGP U.S. bronze medalist.

Programs

Competitive highlights 
JGP: Junior Grand Prix

References

External links 
 
 

2004 births
Living people
Russian male single skaters